Johann Friedrich Steinkopf may refer to:

 Johann Friedrich Steinkopf (painter) (1737–1825), German landscape, animal and porcelain painter
 Johann Friedrich Steinkopf (publisher) (1771–1852), German bookseller and publisher